is a Japanese footballer who plays for Kataller Toyama.

Club statistics
Updated to 23 February 2016.

References

External links

Profile at Kataller Toyama

1996 births
Living people
Association football people from Toyama Prefecture
Japanese footballers
J3 League players
Kataller Toyama players
Association football midfielders